Wilfred Hoyland (March 1898 – after 1925) was an English professional footballer who played in the Football League for Swansea Town, Birmingham and Brighton & Hove Albion.

Hoyland was born in Pontefract, which was then in the West Riding of Yorkshire. He made his debut in the Football League for Swansea Town in the recently formed Third Division South. He then played for Bury, though not in the Football League, and for Glossop before joining Birmingham in September 1923. Described as a well-built winger, he had a run of games in the First Division deputising for the injured Billy Harvey, but at the end of the 1923–24 season moved back to the Third Division with Brighton & Hove Albion. He played five times in the league for Brighton, but was primarily a reserve.

References

1898 births
Year of death missing
Sportspeople from Pontefract
English footballers
Association football wingers
Swansea City A.F.C. players
Bury F.C. players
Glossop North End A.F.C. players
Birmingham City F.C. players
Brighton & Hove Albion F.C. players
English Football League players
Date of birth missing
Place of death missing